F70 or F.70 may refer to:

Vehicles 
Aircraft
 Farman F.70, a French transport aircraft 
 Fokker 70, a Dutch airliner

Automobiles
 Daihatsu Rocky (F70), a Japanese off-road vehicle
 Ferrari F70, an Italian sports car
 Kaicene F70, a Chinese pickup truck
 Toyota Kijang (F70), a Japanese pickup truck

Ships
 Georges Leygues-class frigates, a class of anti-submarine frigates of the French Navy
 , a Leander-class frigate of the Royal Navy

Other uses 
 French Valley Airport, in Riverside County, California
 Mild mental retardation
 Nikon F70, a camera